Giuseppe Schirò Di Maggio (Arbërisht Zef Skiro Di Maxho), born in 1944, is an Arbëreshë poet and dramatist of Piana degli Albanesi in Sicily.

He studied at the Università di Palermo. Schirò Di Maggio is currently the editor-in-chief of the magazine Albanian World ( or ), and the children's school text books Udhëtimi and Udha e Mbarë.

Works

Poems
Nëpër udhat e Parrajsit Shqipëtarë dhe t'Arbëreshë (Travelling though Albanian and Arberesh paradises) - Piana degli Albanesi, 1974.
Lufta e mivet me brethqit (Battle of Frogs and Mice) - Piana degli Albanesi, 1975.
Fatosat (The daring ones) - Settimo Torinese, 1977/79.

Poetry
Sunata (Sonata), collection of poetry written 1965/'75 - Settimo Torinese.
Më para se të ngriset (Before dusk) - Settimo Torinese, 1977.
APKLPS, fotofjalë (APL:PS, photowords) - Settimo Torinese, 1980.
Kopica e ndryshku (The moth and the rust) - Palermo, 1981.
Gjuha e bukës - ed. Ali Podrimja, Rilindja, 1981 - Prishtina.
Përtej maleve prapa kodrës (Across the mountains behind the hill), ed. Nasho Jorgaqi - Shtepia Botuese "Naim Frashëri", Tirana, 1985.
'Vjeç të tua 500 (500 years of you) - Mondo Albanese, 1988.
Laerti, i jati (Laert, the father) - Mondo Albanese, Piana degli Albanesi, 1989.
Metaforë (Metaphor) -  Mondo Albanese, 1990.
Kosova Lule (Kosovo Flower) - Mondo Albanese, 1991.
Anije me vela e me motor (Sailboat with motor) - Mondo Albanese, 1992.
Ne pas se pencher au dehors (Do not lean out) - Mondo Albanese, 1994.
Poezi ghushtotre e tjera (August poetry and others) - Mondo Albanese, 1995.
Kopshti im me dritare (My garden with windows) - Mondo Albanese, 1996.
Dhembje e ngrirë (Frozen pain), ed. Anton Nikë Berisha - Palermo, 1998.
Gieometri dhe ikje (Geometry and escapes) - Mondo Albanese, 1998.
Sontete (Sonnets) - Mondo Albanese, 1999.
Poezi dashurie në kohë vdekjeje (Love poetry at a time of death) - Kosova Martire Secondo Trimestre, 1999.
Atje kam (There I have), bilingual verses, ed. Salvatore Sciascia, Caltanissetta, 2004.
Ishuj (Islands) - Piana degli Albanesi, 2007.
Trimdita (Braveday) - Piana degli Albanesi, 2009.

Theatrical plays
Dashuri magjkië (Magical love) - Mondo Albanese, 1982.
Pethku (The legacy) - M. Albanese, 1982.
Paja (Dowry) - M. Albanese, 1983.
Mushti 1860 (The must 1860) - M. Albanese, 1984.
Shumë vizita (Many visits) - M. Albanese, 1986.
Oremira (Talisman) - M. Albanese, 1988.
Për tokën fisnike të Horës (From the noble land of Piana) - M. Albanese, 1989.
Investime në jug (Investments in the south) - M. Albanese, 1990.
Mëso artën (Learn the art) - M. Albanese, 1992.
Gjinde si tjera (People like others) - M. Albanese, 1992.
Kërkuesit (The searchers) - M. Albanese, 1994.
Lule të shumta ka gjinestra (Genista has many flowers) - Quaderni di Biblos, Comune di Piana degli Albanesi, 1997.
Ujët e Rruzahajnit (Water of Ruzahajn) – M. Albanese, 1999.
Flutura çë do fluturonjë (The butterfly that wants to fly), Piana degli Albanesi, 2005.
Gjëndje e përkohshme (Temporary situation), Piana degli Albanesi, 2006.

References

Italian people of Arbëreshë descent
Living people
People from Piana degli Albanesi
1944 births
Albanian-language poets
Albanian-language writers
20th-century Albanian poets
21st-century Albanian poets
20th-century Italian poets
21st-century Italian poets
21st-century Italian male writers
Albanian male poets
Italian male poets
Albanian dramatists and playwrights
Italian male dramatists and playwrights
20th-century Italian dramatists and playwrights
21st-century dramatists and playwrights
20th-century Italian male writers